The HD Pentax-D FA* 50mm f/1.4 SDM AW lens is a professional normal prime lens for the Pentax K-mount. It was officially announced on October 27th 2017, launched on June 28th 2018, and first shipped on July 26th 2018.

Its notable features include Pentax's first in-house ring-type ultrasonic motor for fast autofocus, full dust and water resistance, and an advanced optical formula for high-resolution images with smooth bokeh.

While this lens is developed and manufactured by Pentax, Tokina offers an optically identical lens as part of their "Opera" series for Canon EF and Nikon F mount.

Notes

References

External links 
Product page Ricoh Imaging UK
Product page Ricoh Imaging USA
Product page Ricoh Imaging Global
Special Content Site Ricoh Imaging Global
Development Update - HD PENTAX-D FA★50mmF1.4 SDM AW (tentative) Ricoh Imaging UK
Pentax HD Pentax-D FA* 50mm F1.4 Lens Facebook Live event by SRS Microsystems
HD PENTAX-D FA★ 50mm F1.4 SDM AW - Touch and Try Event at SRS (UK) - August 10th by PENTAXever.com
Official Product Brochure

RICOH to Exhibit One Reference Product at CP+ 2018 Camera and Imaging Show Ricoh Imaging Global
Development update regarding the HD PENTAX-D FA★50mmF1.4 SDM AW (Tentative name) Ricoh Imaging Global

Lens Review ePHOTOzine
Lens Review PCMag.com
Lens Reviews Digital Trends
Lens Review (german) Pictures Magazin 10/2018

50
Camera lenses introduced in 2018